Brian Walsh (Born November 6, 1954) is an American retired professional ice hockey player. Walsh played hockey at Matignon High School and became a star on the Notre Dame Fighting Irish men's ice hockey team, where he is the all-time leading scorer. Walsh also was a first team All American. He then played five games in the World Hockey Association with the Calgary Cowboys during the 1976–77 WHA season.

Awards and honors

References

External links
 

1954 births
AHCA Division I men's ice hockey All-Americans
Calgary Cowboys players
Ice hockey players from Massachusetts
Living people
New England Whalers draft picks
Notre Dame Fighting Irish men's ice hockey players
Canadian ice hockey right wingers